Gino Mattarelli  (Bertinoro, 28 October 1921Florence, 25 October 1986) was an Italian politician, deputy of the Christian Democracy party.

Christian Democracy (Italy) politicians
20th-century Italian politicians
1921 births
1986 deaths
People from Bertinoro